Girl with a Future is a 1954 West German comedy drama film directed by Thomas Engel and starring Herta Staal, Peter Pasetti and Nadja Tiller. It was shot at the Tempelhof Studios in West Berlin.The film's sets were designed by the art directors Emil Hasler and Walter Kutz.

Cast
 Herta Staal as Inge Wendler
 Peter Pasetti as Achmed Spiro
 Nadja Tiller as Fatme
 Hans Richter as Peter
 Grethe Weiser as Frau Sanders
 Carl-Heinz Schroth as Otto Rontholz
 Al Hoosmann as Hassan
 Ursula von Manescul as Sybille
 Kurt Vespermann as Emil Duske
 Joe Furtner as Medefint
 Wolfgang Jansen
 Hans Hessling
 Emmy Burg
 Wolfgang Kühne
 Hans-Otto Krüger
 Lou Seitz

References

Bibliography
 Bock, Hans-Michael & Bergfelder, Tim. The Concise CineGraph. Encyclopedia of German Cinema. Berghahn Books, 2009.

External links 
 

1954 films
1954 comedy-drama films
German comedy-drama films
West German films
1950s German-language films
Films directed by Thomas Engel
Films shot at Tempelhof Studios
German black-and-white films
1950s German films